USMP may stand for:
 United States Mint Police
 United States Military Police
 US Marijuana Party
 United States Microgravity Payload
 Universidad San Martín de Porres